Alemán's snail-eater (Plesiodipsas perijanensis) is a genus of snake in the family Colubridae.

It is found in Venezuela and Colombia.

References 

Colubrids
Reptiles described in 1953
Reptiles of Venezuela
Reptiles of Colombia